No One Can Achieve Perfection is a 2008 documentary film directed by Katrin Ottarsdóttir. It is a portrait of the Faroese sculptor Hans Pauli Olsen (born 1957).

Synopsis
The film follows the creation of sculptor Hans Pauli Olsen's biggest sculpture so far. We take part in the process when the artist is working in his backyard studio together with his young nude model. We are the fly on the wall, when the artist forgets about the camera and exists only for creating his art with his bare hands. And we experience the contrast between art as subtile, exhibited works in distinguished halls of art and as a simple lump of clay in a dirty garage.

External links
Blue Bird Film Website of filmmaker Katrin Ottarsdóttir

2008 documentary films
2008 films
Danish documentary films
Faroese documentary films
Faroese-language films
Films directed by Katrin Ottarsdóttir
Documentary films about visual artists
Films about sculptors